Brazos Independent School District is a public school district based in Wallis, Texas (USA). The district lies in two counties, Austin and Fort Bend.  In addition to Wallis, the district also serves the city of Orchard.

History
In the 1970s Orchard ISD and Wallis ISD merged to form Wallis-Orchard ISD.  In the late 1990s the District changed its name to Brazos ISD.  The former Orchard ISD portion is in Fort Bend County and was formed from 4 Common Schools: Orchard, Randon, Krasna & Tavener.

Finances
As of the 2010-2011 school year, the appraised valuation of property in the district was $326,473,000. The maintenance tax rate was $1.04 and the bond tax rate was $0.36 per $100 of appraised valuation.

Academic achievement
In 2011, the school district was rated "recognized" by the Texas Education Agency.  Thirty-five percent of districts in Texas in 2011 received the same rating. No state accountability ratings will be given to districts in 2012. A school district in Texas can receive one of four possible rankings from the Texas Education Agency: Exemplary (the highest possible ranking), Recognized, Academically Acceptable, and Academically Unacceptable (the lowest possible ranking).

TEA District Report Card
2020: Not Rated due to COVID-19
2019: B rated with an overall score of 88/100

Schools
Regular instructional
Brazos High School (Grades 9-12)
Brazos Middle School (Grades 6-8)
Brazos Elementary School (Grades EE-5)
Alternative instructional
Prairie Harbor Alternative School (Grades 5-12). Closed September 2020. This school was located at and serviced a residential treatment facility that closed.

Special programs

Athletics
Brazos High School participates in Baseball, Cheer, Cross Country, Golf, Football, Power Lifting, Softball, Tennis, Track and Volleyball.  In 2021-2022 the UIL has placed Brazos High School football in UIL Class 3A, Division 2, Region 4, District 14.

Band
The Mighty Brazos Cougar Band is available for all grades 6-12 to join.

See also

List of school districts in Texas
List of high schools in Texas

References

External links
Brazos ISD

School districts in Austin County, Texas
School districts in Fort Bend County, Texas
1970s establishments in Texas